Léua is a city and municipality in Angola of the Moxico province. The municipal headquarters are 62 km east of the provincial capital, Luena. The municipality had a population of 32,457 in 2014.

References

Populated places in Moxico Province
Municipalities of Angola